In music, Op. 110 stands for Opus number 110. Compositions that are assigned this number include:

 Beethoven – Piano Sonata No. 31
 Dvořák – The Wild Dove
 Mendelssohn – Piano Sextet
 Prokofiev – Waltz Suite
 Reger – Geistliche Gesänge, Op. 110
 Schumann – Piano Trio No. 3
 Shostakovich – String Quartet No. 8